The men's 3000 metres steeplechase was the only steeplechase on the Athletics at the 1964 Summer Olympics program in Tokyo.  It was held on 15 October and 17 October 1964.  30 athletes from 19 nations entered, with 1 not starting in the first round.  The first round was held on 15 October and the final on 17 October.

New Olympic records for the event were set in two of the three heats as well as in the final, for a total of three out of four races resulting in a new record.

Results

First round

The top three runners in each of the 3 heats as well as the fastest remaining runner advanced.

First round, heat 1

First round, heat 2

First round, heat 3

Final

Alexeiunas could not match his record-setting pace from the heats, falling to 7th in the final.  Herriott, who had set the record Alexeiunas had broken, improved on his own time but could not reach Alexeiunas's record as he placed second.  Roelants, the world record-holder who had run behind Alexeiunas in the heat, turned out victorious in the final, breaking the Soviet's record by a full second to set a third new record in the event.

References

Athletics at the 1964 Summer Olympics
Steeplechase at the Olympics
Men's events at the 1964 Summer Olympics